The following table presents a listing of Nigeria's 36 states ranked in order of their total population based on the 2006 Census figures, as well as their 2019 projected populations, which were published by the National Bureau of Statistics.

References

Population
Nigeria, population